Jerry Waters (born Reginald Waters, 3 April 1915 - died 31 January 1997) was one of the top British racing cyclists of the 1940s. He came second to Ernie Clements in the National Cyclists' Union's national road championship in 1946. He continued competing as a veteran.

Brother of Wilfred Waters, cyclist & Olympic bronze medalist.

Palmarès

1946
2nd National road championship (NCU)

References

1915 births
1997 deaths
British male cyclists